Stevča Mihailović (Jagodina January 1804 – September 19, 1888 Belgrade), was a Serbian politician and Prime Minister.

Biography
Under the Prince Miloš he was a customs official, and during the first reign of Prince Mihailo district chief. In 1842, when Toma Vučić-Perišić rebelled in favor of the Constitution, the military tries to help the prince, but without success. Under Prince Alexander Karađorđević, Mihailović engaged in trade in Jagodina.

During the St. Andrew's Day Assembly in 1858, Mihailović was the leader of the Obrenović faction and led the delegation that demanded the abdication of Prince Alexander Karađorđević. After the return of Miloš in 1858, he became president of the Council, while under Mihailo retired.

In 1875, and from 1876 until 1878, Mihailović became the Prime Minister. This second Mihailovic government led the country during the Serbian-Turkish Wars (1876-1878), and also led to Serbia's territorial expansion and independence at the Congress of Berlin.

See also
Cabinet of Stevča Mihailović II
List of prime ministers of Serbia

External links
Memoirs of Stevča Mihailovic

1804 births
1888 deaths
Politicians from Jagodina
Prime Ministers of Serbia